The following is a list of awards and nominations received by Frances Conroy throughout her stage and acting career.

During Conroy's stage and acting career, she has been awarded the Golden Globe Award for Best Actress in a Television Series Drama in 2004 for her critically acclaimed drama series Six Feet Under, for which she starred in from 2001 to 2005. She was also nominated for four Primetime Emmy Awards in the Lead Actress in a Drama Series category, without winning. In 2012, she nominated for a fifth Emmy for American Horror Story: Murder House, in the Supporting Actress in a Miniseries or a Movie category.

In 2003 and 2004, Conroy along with the cast of Six Feet Under won the Screen Actors Guild Award for Outstanding Performance by an Ensemble in a Drama Series and Conroy also won the 2004 award for Outstanding Performance by a Female Actor in a Drama Series.

During her stage career, Conroy has been nominated for one Tony Award and four Drama Desk Awards, winning once.

Film awards

Critics' Choice Awards

Florida Film Critics Circle Awards

Georgia Film Critics Association Awards

Gold Derby Film Awards

Houston Film Critics Society Awards

New York Film Critics Online Awards

Satellite Awards

Seattle Film Critics Society Awards

Washington D.C. Area Film Critics Association Awards

Television awards

Golden Globe Awards

OFTA Television Awards

Primetime Emmy Awards

Saturn Awards

Screen Actors Guild Awards

Stage awards

Drama Desk Awards

Obie Awards

Outer Critics Circle Awards

Tony Awards

References

"Frances Conroy – Milestones". TCM Movie Database. TBS. tcm.com. Retrieved October 9, 2014.

External links

 
 
 
 

Conroy, Frances